Pensford railway station served the village of Pensford, Somerset, England from 1873 to 1964 on the Bristol and North Somerset Railway.

History 
The station opened on 3 September 1873 by the Great Western Railway. It was situated on the Station Approach road. In 1898, the platforms were extended and a new signal box opened on the south end of the up platform. The principal traffic was coal and passengers. The track ran through the Pensford Viaduct and it was 330 yards long. The track has since been lifted but the arches still remain today. The station closed to passengers on 2 November 1959 and to goods traffic on 15 June 1964.

References

External links 

Disused railway stations in Somerset
Railway stations in Great Britain opened in 1873
Railway stations in Great Britain closed in 1959
1873 establishments in England
1959 disestablishments in England
Former Great Western Railway stations